This is a list of American films released in 1993.
Schindler's List won the Academy Award for Best Picture.

Jurassic Park was the highest-grossing film of 1993.

Highest-grossing

A-Z

See also
 1993 in American television
 1993 in the United States

References

External links

 
 List of 1993 box office number-one films in the United States

1993
Films
Lists of 1993 films by country or language